Mordellistenochroa is a genus of beetles in the family Mordellidae, containing the following species:

 Mordellistenochroa fallaciosa (Ermisch, 1969)
 Mordellistenochroa strejceki Horák, 1982

References

Mordellidae